USS New Haven may refer to:

  was a gundalow on Lake Champlain that participated in the Battle of Valcour Island during the American Revolutionary War
  was initially laid down as a  light cruiser, but after the attack on Pearl Harbor she was reordered as an  light aircraft carrier and renamed 
  was planned as a  light cruiser, but her construction was canceled in August 1945
 USS New Haven (CLK-2) was a planned Norfolk-class hunter-killer cruiser, but her construction was canceled in February 1951 before she was laid down

United States Navy ship names